Sepicana is a genus of longhorn beetles of the subfamily Lamiinae, containing the following species:

 Sepicana albomaculata (Gahan, 1915)
 Sepicana arfakensis Breuning, 1950
 Sepicana armata (Montrouzier, 1855)
 Sepicana hauseri (Aurivillius, 1907)
 Sepicana migsominea Gilmour, 1949
 Sepicana shanahani Gressitt, 1984

References

Tmesisternini